Bad Girls All-Star Battle is a reality competition series that aired on Oxygen, and is the fourth spin-off of Bad Girls Club. It is the Bad Girls Club version of MTV's The Challenge. It premiered on May 21, 2013, with Ray J as the host.

Series overview

Format
Alumni from previous seasons of Bad Girls Club battle for a grand prize of $100,000. It takes place in a mansion located in Los Angeles. A group of bad girls will be separated into two teams and compete for two competitions, The Captain's Challenge, where the winner will be Captain of the team and will be safe for the week, and the Team's Challenge, where both teams compete and the winning team will be safe for the week. The losing team has to put up two girls for elimination. Halfway through the season, the teams will be dissolved and the remaining contestants compete for the Battle Challenge, where the battle challenge winner will be safe for the last few weeks. In the season finale, there is a final challenge where the final three are put to the ultimate test to win the prize and title.

In season 1, fourteen bad girls competed for the grand prize and title of "The Baddest Bad Girl of All Time."

Introduced in season 2, sixteen bad girls competed through enhanced challenges, which were more extreme than last season. This season, four of the girls returned from last season. The winner won the prize and title as "The Baddest Bad Girl on the Planet."

References

External links
 
 

2010s American reality television series
2013 American television series debuts
2014 American television series endings
English-language television shows
Oxygen (TV channel) original programming
Television series by Bunim/Murray Productions
Bad Girls Club
American television spin-offs
2010s American game shows
Reality television spin-offs
African-American reality television series